This is a partial list of topics related to Mayotte.

Geography

Landforms 
 Islands of Mayotte
 Pamanzi (second-largest island of Mayotte)

Settlements

History 

 Elections in Mayotte
 2004 Mahoran legislative election
 2008 Mahoran legislative election
 2009 Mahoran status referendum
 Postage stamps and postal history of Mayotte

Government and politics 

 Elections in Mayotte
 General Council of Mayotte

Administrative divisions 

 Acoua
 Bandraboua
 Bandrélé
 Bouéni
 Chiconi
 Chirongui
 Dembeni
 Dzaoudzi
 Kani-Kéli
 Koungou
 Mamoudzou
 Mtsamboro
 M'Tsangamouji
 Ouangani
 Pamandzi
 Sada, Mayotte
 Tsingoni

Foreign relations

Political parties 

 Force of the Rally and the Alliance for Democracy
 Mahoran Departmentalist Movement
 Mahoré People's Movement

Politicians 
 Saïd Omar Oili

Economy 

 Communications in Mayotte
 Euro (official currency)
 .yt (Internet country code top-level domain)

Transport

Airports 

 Dzaoudzi Pamandzi International Airport

Demographics

Languages 
 French language
 Shimaore language

Religion 
 Islam in Mayotte

Culture

Cuisine

Music

National symbols 

 Coat of arms of Mayotte
 Flag of Mayotte

Sport 

 Complexe de Kawani
 Mayotte national rugby union team

Football 
 Coupe de Mayotte
 FC Mtsapéré
 Mayotte Division Honneur
 Mayotte national football team

Environment

Wildlife 

 Boophis
 Mayotte drongo
 Pasteur's day gecko
 Robert Mertens's day gecko
 Common brown lemur

See also 
 Lists of country-related topics